Semesa Vakalelea Naiseruvati (born 20 September 1963) is a Fijian international lawn bowler.

Bows career
Naiseruvati won the gold medal in the triples with Daniel Lum On and Samuela Tuikiligana at the 2011 Asia Pacific Bowls Championships in Adelaide.

He was selected to represent Fiji at the 2018 Commonwealth Games in the Gold Coast, where he competed in the triples and fours.

After winning the singles gold medal at the Lawn bowls at the 2019 Pacific Games he announced his retirement.

In 2022, he competed in the men's singles and the men's triples at the 2022 Commonwealth Games.

References

1963 births
Fijian male bowls players
Living people
People from Vanua Balavu
Bowls players at the 2018 Commonwealth Games
Bowls players at the 2022 Commonwealth Games
Commonwealth Games competitors for Fiji